The Murphys Hotel in Murphys, California, is one of the oldest hotels still operating in California.

First called the Sperry and Perry Hotel, it was opened by James L. Sperry and John Perry on August 20, 1856. The town of Murphys was a popular stopping point along the stagecoach route from Milton to the Calaveras Big Trees. Thought to be fireproof due to its stone construction and iron shutters, the hotel was damaged in the fire of 1859 that destroyed most of the downtown area. However, it was quickly restored and reopened by spring of 1860.

The new Sperry and Perry Hotel was considered one of the finest hotels outside of San Francisco, and was host to many famous people over the years. Copies of the original register show such signatures as Mark Twain, John Jacob Astor, Ulysses S. Grant, John Bidwell, Charles Bolles (alias Black Bart), Henry Ward Beecher, Horatio Alger, J.P. Morgan and Thomas Lipton.

Renamed the Mitchler Hotel in 1882, and the Murphys Hotel in 1945 by the McKimins family, it has since had several owners. The hotel is registered as California Historical Landmark #267 and is listed on the National Register of Historic Places (NPS-1971000134).

Gordon Ramsay's Hotel Hell covered the hotel in an episode of the series, broadcast on September 9, 2014, on the U.S. Fox television network. It also appeared in the public television series Road Trip with Huell Howser episode on the Mother Lode.

References

External links

Murphys Hotel website

History of Calaveras County, California
Hotels established in 1856
Hotel buildings on the National Register of Historic Places in California
California Historical Landmarks
Buildings and structures in Calaveras County, California
National Register of Historic Places in Calaveras County, California